Izvestia Moskovskogo Soveta Rabochikh Deputatov was a Russian daily newspaper  first issued by the Moscow Soviet both during the 1905 Revolution. The title was revived when the Biulleten’ Soveta rabochikh deputatov was renamed from March 15 (28) 1917, following the February Revolution.

1905 editions

From 7 (20) until 12 (25)December 1905, six issues were published, with  5,000–10,000 copies of each. It contained resolutions of the Moscow soviet of workers’ deputies and of trade unions as well as articles materials concerning the uprisings both in Moscow and across the Russian Empire. Many of the short articles, notices, and appeals were written by workers. On 7 December, a general strike shut down all the other newspapers published in Moscow.

1917 editions

References

Russian-language newspapers published in Russia